Skyler Joseph Clipner, professionally known as Skyler Stone (born January 1, 1979) is an American actor who starred in Con which ran on Comedy Central for two months in the spring of 2005.

Early life and education
Stone was born in St. Louis, Missouri and moved to Kalamazoo, Michigan with his family at the age of 14. He attended Western Michigan University.

Career 
Stone started his career in radio at WRKR in Kalamazoo, Michigan. His first movie role was in The Rules of Attraction, playing a speed freak named Quinlivan in a scene that ended up cut from the film. He played Scarlett Johansson's character's husband in the flashback scenes for The Island, and a cook in Waiting.... Stone was cast in Christopher Guest's For Your Consideration as a trashy radio morning show host after Guest saw the "Cancun Coma" episode of Con. In July 2007, Stone was cast in the comedy House Broken, as Danny DeVito's son.

Stone sold a pilot called Skyler's Revolution to Fox Broadcasting Company and Warner Bros. Television in 2007, wherein he made prank calls to celebrities, but it was not picked up for a series. He appeared in the CSI: NY episode "Youngblood." Stone was a contestant on Dog Eat Dog and Whammy! The All-New Press Your Luck twice (the second time in the Tournament of Losers). In 2010 he appeared in the CBS sitcom Rules of Engagement.

Stone is a regular at the Laugh Factory, The Improv, and The Comedy Store, in Hollywood, California. He made his first national stand-up appearance on The Late Late Show with Craig Ferguson on January 3, 2007.

In 2013, he provided the voice for Scowler, a Pachyrhinosaurus in BBC Earth's Walking With Dinosaurs: The Movie.

Personal life 
Stone resides in Sherman Oaks, California.

Filmography

Film

Television

Video games

References

External links

Bio at Skyler Stone's official site

1979 births
Living people
Male actors from St. Louis
Contestants on American game shows
American people of English descent
American people of Scottish descent
American people of Irish descent
American people of Welsh descent
American people of German descent
American people of Slovenian descent
American people of Croatian descent